Manorama Music is a music company based out in Kerala, India. It owns probably the largest music label in Kerala. The label has produced and distributed film soundtracks, poems, cartoon series, music albums etc. The company is owned by M.M. Publications Ltd which also owns Malayala Manorama, one of the largest newspaper company in Kerala.

References

Record label distributors
Indian music record labels
Malayala Manorama group
2002 establishments in Kerala
Companies based in Kochi
Indian companies established in 2002
Record labels established in 2002